Broomfield School is a secondary school located in Arnos Grove, Enfield, Greater London.

History
Arnos School was founded in 1938 on Broomfield School's current site and took on the senior pupils of Bowes School, which thus became exclusively a primary school. It later became a secondary modern school. Extensions were made to the original site in 1948 and 1957.

In 1960, Minchenden School took over the buildings in Fox Lane, Palmers Green that had been vacated by the move of Southgate County School to its current site in Sussex Way, Cockfosters.

The Arnos School buildings were further extended in 1964 and 1966. It became a comprehensive school in 1967 with the feeder schools Bowes, Garfield, Oakthorpe, Our Lady of Lourdes Roman Catholic, and St. Michael's Church of England primary schools, and some further extensions were made in 1967, 1969, and 1972. In 1984, Arnos School and Minchenden School were merged to form a new school, located at the Arnos School premises and named Broomfield School.

Broomfield is still a comprehensive school and in 2008 received designation as a specialist humanities college. It was, at one time, one of the largest secondary schools in the Borough of Enfield, due to its location near the borders of the neighbouring boroughs of Haringey and Barnet, but since the development of Alexandra Park School in Haringey in 2003, it has steadily lost pupils from its feeder primary schools.

An OFSTED inspection in October 2011 judged the school to be inadequate and placed it into special measures. A new leadership group was appointed to turn the school around, and, in 2013, the school came out of special measures. In May 2015, the school was judged by Ofsted to be a 'good' school.

The local authority closed its sixth form provision due to falling numbers, after the school had spent a substantial amount of money developing a new sixth form block. Undeterred, the school worked collaboratively with other schools in the borough to develop the school's campus, which is now home to four schools: Bowes Southgate Green Primary School, which opened in 2014 and now takes two forms of entry; West Lea School, which provides additional resourced provision to support children with special needs in a mainstream setting; Winchmore School, which is providing sixth form courses at the newly refurbished sixth form block; and, of course, Broomfield Secondary School.

References

External links
Broomfield School website
League table results
British History Online - Edmonton Education

Secondary schools in the London Borough of Enfield
Educational institutions established in 1938
Foundation schools in the London Borough of Enfield
Arnos Grove
1938 establishments in England